Nanjiyamma (born 1 January 1958) is an Indian singer who hails from a tribal community in Kerala. She garnered public attention after singing playback in the Malayalam film Ayyappanum Koshiyum in 2020. The film's title song "Kalakkatha" written by herself in Irula language and composed by Jakes Bejoy attained popularity after its release on YouTube. The song received more than 10 million views in a month.

Early life and career 
She hails from an Irula community in Nakkupathi, a tribal village in Attappadi in Palakkad district, Kerala, India.

Nanjiyamma is a folksinger of the Azad Kala Samithi, led by Pazhani Swami, a tribal artist in Attappadi. Later in 2020, she was introduced into playback singing through the film Ayyappanum Koshiyum. She has also played the role of mother-in-law to the protagonist Biju Menon in the film. She finds a livelihood by farming and feeding cattle. She sings mostly folk songs that went past through generations. She first sung for a documentary for Mathrumozhi titled Aggedu Nayaga directed by Sindhu Sajan. Nanjiyamma sung the promotional song for Government of Kerala's housing programme Life Mission and it was the first time Irula language was used for a public relations program in Kerala.

Nanjiyamma was awarded the National Film Award for Best Female Playback Singer in the 68th National Film Awards of India for the song  "Kalakkatha" song from the movie Ayyappanum Koshiyum. She received special Jury Award of Kerala State Film Award in 2020.

Discography

Filmography

Television

References

Living people
1960 births
Singers from Kerala
Malayalam playback singers
Indian women playback singers
Best Female Playback Singer National Film Award winners
Scheduled Tribes of Kerala
Actresses in Malayalam cinema
Actresses in Malayalam television